Iredalea thalycra is a species of sea snail, a marine gastropod mollusk in the family Drilliidae.

Description
The length of the shell attains 6 mm, its diameter 1.75 mm.

A small brightly banded shell. Its colour is white, banded with ochre. The shell contains 7 gradate whorls, longitudinally stoutly ribbed. The aperture is oblong. The outer lip is slightly thickened. The columella is ochre-tinged plain.

Distribution
This marine species occurs off the Loyalty Islands

References

  Tucker, J.K. 2004 Catalog of recent and fossil turrids (Mollusca: Gastropoda). Zootaxa 682:1–1295

External links
 

thalycra
Gastropods described in 1896